Warrel Dane (born Warrel George Baker; March 7, 1961 – December 13, 2017) was an American musician who was the lead singer for the heavy metal bands Sanctuary and Nevermore. He was a natural baritone; though he was known for his high-pitched vocals with Serpent's Knight and on the first two Sanctuary albums, later in his career, Dane became more notable for his distinctively deep, dramatic voice.

Career 

Dane was trained for five years as an opera singer and utilized a very broad vocal range, spanning from notes as low as the G below low C, or G1, to notes as high as the B below soprano C, or B5. While his high head voice style vocals were much more prominent in the older Sanctuary albums, there were instances where he utilized it in Nevermore as well. Sanctuary's 2014 comeback album The Year the Sun Died includes these higher passages on three songs. 

Dane provided the voice of Candynose Twinskins in the musical comedy Metalocalypse on Adult Swim.

Dane's first ever solo record, Praises to the War Machine, was released May 13, 2008, on Century Media Records. He was working on a second album at the time of his death which was going to be different than the first solo effort: "Some of it is just brutally heavy", Dane said. In March 2016, the title was revealed to be Shadow Work. The recording session was originally planned for October 2016.

Influences 
Dane's musical influences were Judas Priest, Iron Maiden, Black Sabbath, Jefferson Airplane, Simon & Garfunkel, The Beatles and The Doors, while Ronnie James Dio, Rob Halford, George Strait and Bruce Dickinson were his main vocal inspirations.

Death 
On December 13, 2017, it was reported that Dane had died of a heart attack in São Paulo, Brazil, at the age of 56. It was there that he was working on his second solo album, Shadow Work. The guitarist of Dane's solo band, Johnny Moraes, stated that, "He died in the night. He had a heart attack. He was in the apartment where he stayed during the recording of the album when it happened. I gave him cardiac massage and we called the Mobile Emergency Care Service (SAMU), who came very fast, but when they arrived, he was already dead." Moraes stated that Dane was already facing a lot of problems with his health due to a history of alcohol abuse and type 2 diabetes.

Legacy 
On January 14, 2018, one month after Dane's death, Brazilian movie director Daney Carvalho released his debut short film O Ano em que o Sol Morreu (a reference to the title of the Sanctuary album The Year the Sun Died), a drama and a tribute to Dane, on YouTube. The movie was originally released in May 2016 as part of a Brazilian festival, but the director chose to make it publicly available after Dane's death. Dane himself met with Carvalho that year, when the independent director interviewed him for a local Brazilian TV program during college. According to Carvalho, Dane was given a private screening of the movie after he finished post-production and thought it was "great" and "terrifying".

Discography

Serpent's Knight 
 Released from the Crypt (1983)
 Silent Knight... of Myth and Destiny (2010) (disc one vocals)

Sanctuary 
 Refuge Denied (1988)
 Into the Mirror Black (1990)
 Into the Mirror Live (1991)
 The Year the Sun Died (2014)
 Inception (2017)

Behemoth 
The Apostasy (2007, guest vocals)

Lady Catman 
Eyes Wide Open (2018, guest vocals)

Solo 
Praises to the War Machine (2008)
Shadow Work (2018)

Shaded Enmity 
And Life Was Great.... (2013)

Nevermore 
Nevermore (1995)
In Memory (EP, 1996)
The Politics of Ecstasy (1996)
Dreaming Neon Black (1999)
Dead Heart in a Dead World (2000)
Enemies of Reality (2003, remixed/remastered in 2005)
This Godless Endeavor (2005)
The Year of the Voyager (2008)
The Obsidian Conspiracy (2010)

References

External links 

1961 births
2017 deaths
American male singers
American heavy metal singers
Century Media Records artists
American people of Russian descent
Musicians from Seattle
Nevermore members